Galactosidase, beta 1-like 3 is a protein in humans that is encoded by the GLB1L3 gene.

References

Further reading